Kankoura, Bigel Kankoura, or Biguel Kankoura is a village in the Tiankoura Department of Bougouriba Province in south-western Burkina Faso. The village has a population of 409.

Geography 
Kankoura has a latitude of 13° 48' 51" N and a longitude of 5° 42' 34" E. Its climate is Hot semi-arid. The estimated terrain is 221 meters above sea level.

References

Populated places in the Sud-Ouest Region (Burkina Faso)
Bougouriba Province